The following is a list of widely known trees and shrubs. Taxonomic families for the following trees and shrubs are listed in alphabetical order, likewise the genera and closely related species. The list currently includes 1351 species.


Gymnosperms

Angiosperms

See also
List of tree genera

References

External links 
Forest Atlas of the United States
European Atlas of Forest Tree Species
The IUCN Red List of Threatened Species
USDA Forest Service Individual Tree Species Parameter Maps
The Gymnosperm Database

 List
Trees
 
Trees
Biogeography